Jason Garcia is a contemporary Native American artist in the United States, who was born in Santa Clara, New Mexico. His work has been exhibited the Smithsonian in Washington D.C, the Heard Museum in Phoenix, the Palm Springs Art Museum, and many more. He won the 2018 Mentor Fellowship Award under the Native Arts and Cultures Foundation amongst many others.

He teaches many Native American children at summer programs and elementary schools about the art he creates and techniques he uses. Garcia documents the "ever-changing cultural landscape" of Santa Clara. He embodies traditional Pueblo techniques with contemporary imagery; combining native stories, ceremonies, and traditions with modern era constructions such as technology. His primary techniques are clay tiles and printmaking, including lithography, serigraphy, and etching.

Early years 
Jason Garcia, also known as Okuu Pin, translating to "turtle mountain," is from the Santa Clara Pueblo Tewa tribe. His name is representative of the Sandia Mountains that are located East of Albuquerque. The traditional Tewa name for Santa Clara is Khapo Owinge which means rose path.

Garcia grew up in an artistic environment, influencing his passion for art making. His paternal and maternal family members were well known pueblo potters, especially his grandmother, Gloria Garcia, also known as Goldenrod, for her works. His family would make pottery illustrating Pueblo traditions and ceremonies; as a kid, Garcia did not fully understand the imagery and art pieces. Therefore, he began to make artworks with imagery he was familiar with, such as, Star Wars, Spiderman, and Darth Vader; using the same traditional Pueblo techniques to create them.

Another big influence on Garcia was the well-known painter, Pablita Velarde from the Santa Clara Pueblo; she was a painter of the Santa Fe Indian Studio. She would document how the Pueblo was changing and how they were still able to maintain their Pueblo traditions and culture. Very similarly, Garcia is doing the same thing, documenting the changes of the Pueblo, through the contemporary lens. He would do this by incorporating images such as television, cell phones, and social problems that are relevant to today's society.  He sees how these modern aspects of life are changing the pueblo lifestyle, but how the people from Santa Clara are still able to preserve their native culture and language, and that's what he demonstrates through his artworks.

Along with Garcia's iconography in his paintings, his techniques were also a big aspect in incorporating both traditional and contemporary features. Garcia would often use traditional materials and pottery techniques the traditional Pueblo way, with hand-gathered clay, native clay slips and outdoor firings. Garcia also uses more modern techniques such as printmaking. He also used various printmaking techniques such as lithography, serigraphy, and etching. This deviates from the traditional techniques that the Pueblo community would use, but Garcia wanted to appeal to his generation as well as future generations. His works consist of contemporary iconography, therefore his usage of more modern techniques would be more relevant. Garcia felt that these techniques would connect him and the people that viewed his work to his Ancestral past as well as connect future generations to Tewa traditions. He also felt that it was important for his culture to keep certain traditions alive that had been passed down to him and that he had grown up with.

Garcia studied at the University of New Mexico, where he got his Bachelor's degree in Fine Arts in 1998. He recently completed his Masters of Fine Arts at the University of Wisconsin in 2016.

Artworks

Warrior Maiden Muse (2019) 
Part of the Tewa Tales of Suspense Series, this art piece shows the power of the Tewa culture and women on a clay tablet. It was displayed in March 2019 at the Ralph T. Coe Center for the Arts at their exhibition, Imprint. Garcia uses opaque mineral pigment colors and paints using the visuals of comic book art; he uses the pigments instead of Indian ink, which is typically used for comic books. This image on a clay tablet is meant to be and look like a comic book cover. Garcia's demonstration of this powerful woman goes in contrast to the stereotypes that are usually implemented on Native American women. The typical stereotype is that the man is the dominant one in the relationship and the females are very docile. Garcia shows the contrary of this and instead shows a hero of the Tewa people. He incorporates Tewa iconography through her clothing and images like the cloud above her head, clearly showing that they are on Tewa territory, and that she is there to protect them.

Pueblo Warriors Jar (2014) 
Like much of Garcia's artwork, the Pueblo Warriors Jar continues to uphold Garcia's vision of using contemporary imagery and styles to present historical events. This art piece uses comic book iconography to depict Pueblo warriors and heroes that he often portrays in the comic-series, Tewa Tales of Suspense through screen prints and clay tiles. Garcia's inspiration for this was the 1680 Pueblo Revolt, which he constantly refers back to in many of his art pieces. In this specific piece, Garcia uses Marvel characters, Thor and Loki and puts them alongside historical Pueblo warrior heroes. Through this, Garcia is able to appeal to a larger audience, especially the youth. As well as help them understand their Pueblo culture with familiar iconography that they can relate to.

Tewa Tales of Suspense! 
The Pueblo Revolt of 1680 was a very historical event for the people of Santa Clara; it was one of the most successful attempts in going against the European colonists. For over a decade, there was no intrusion. Unfortunately their independence was taken once again twelve years later. During this time, fighting against the Spanish was a bloodbath and is still to this say a painful episode to remember. Because of this, Garcia felt the need to tell this story to today's generations in ways that they can understand and relate to. In this series, Garcia shows important events of the Pueblo Revolt through comic book iconography and styles. The series consists of seven works that leave a visually powerful impression. There are very few contemporary records and depictions of the Pueblo Revolt, thus Garcia's aspire to tell the Pueblo's perspectives on the story. Through this series, Garcia is bringing the rebellion back to life and grabbing people's attention to remember this important event of Native history. He does this through the use of vibrant colors and comic-book format, that presents a difficult time in American history in a "non-threatening manner," and using this, it allows the viewer to consider controversial aspects of our country's history.

Exhibitions 

 2011  “11.11.11--First Year Graduate Show” Art Lofts Gallery, University of Wisconsin, Madison, WI
2011  “Counting Coup” Museum of Contemporary Native Art, Santa Fe, NM
 2011  Soul Sister: Reimagining Kateri Tekakwitha- Museum of Contemporary Native Arts, Santa Fe, NM
2011  “Comic Art Indigene” Palm Springs Art Museum, Palm Springs, CA
 2010  Transcending Traditions: Contemporary American Indian Artwork - Mesa Contemporary Arts, Mesa, AZ
 2010  POP! Popular Culture in American Indian Art - Heard Museum, Phoenix, AZ
 2008  Map(ing) Exhibition - Tempe Marketplace Night Gallery, Tempe, AZ  
 2007  Clay2 - Arizona State Museum, Tuson, AZ2006 Okuu Pin - The Art of Jason Garcia - Indian Pueblo Cultural Center, Albuquerque, NM
 2006  COLOR - Elements of Earth & Fire - Museum of Indian Arts and Culture, Santa Fe, NM
Indian Pueblo Cultural Center in Albuquerque (2006-2007) 
 2005  HOME - Native People in the Southwest - Heard Museum, Phoenix, AZ
Comic Art Indigene: Smithsonian National Museum of the American Indian in Washington, DC
 Comic Art Indigene: Museum of Indian Arts and Culture in Santa Fe, New Mexico 
 Native Pop!: New Mexico Museum of Art in Santa Fe, New Mexico
Museum of Fine Arts in Santa Fe
 Heard Museum in Phoenix 
 Featured in: Kim and Pat Messier’s Hopi & Pueblo Tiles 
 Featured in: Steve Trimble’s 20th anniversary edition of Talking with the Clay: The Art of Pueblo Pottery in the 21st Century from SAR Press.

Collections 

 Art Talks: Pueblo Warriors Jar by Jason Garcia Joins Rockwell Collection 
 King Galleries: Exceptional Pueblo Pottery and Native Art 
National Hispanic Cultural Center | Albuquerque, NM
Nerman Museum of Contemporary Art | Overland Park, KS
The Nelson-Atkins Museum of Art | Kansas City, MO
Wheelright Museum of the American Indian | Santa Fe, NM
Arizona State University | Tempe, AZ
Buffalo Thunder Resort and Casino | Pojoaque Pueblo, NM
Heard Museum | Phoenix, AZ
National Museum of the American Indian | Washington DC
Santa Clara Pueblo Day School | Santa Clara Pueblo, NM
Poeh Cultural Museum | Pojoaque Pueblo, NM
National Museum of American History | Washington DC

Honors and awards 

2018 Mentor Artist Fellowship
 Where Garcia will mentor David Naranjo in the different printmaking techniques. Focusing on serigraphy-silkscreen printing. He will also teach Naranjo fine-art framing skills, exhibition preparation, and becoming involved in local art communities.
2017 Artist In Business Leadership Fellow: First Peoples Fund 
2016 Artist In Residency: Institute of American Indian Arts
2016 Best of Classification and Best of Division Awards: SWAIA Santa Fe Indian Market
2016 Advanced Opportunity Fellow: University of Wisconsin
2015 Advanced Opportunity Fellow: University of Wisconsin
2012 American Indian Chancellors Fellow: University of Wisconsin
2012 Helen Cox Kersting Award: Eiteljorg Museum of American Indians and Western Art
2011 American Indian Chancellors Fellow: University of Wisconsin 
2010 Judges Choice Award: Heard Museum Guild Indian Fair & Market 
2009 Best of Classification and Best of Division Awards: SWAIA Santa Fe Indian Market
2008 Conrad House Award for Innovation: Heard Museum Guild Indian Fair & Market
2007 Ronald N. & Susan Dubin Fellow: School for Advanced Research
2007 Honorable Mention: Heard Museum Guild Indian Fair & Market 
2006 Second Place and Third Place Awards: SWAIA Santa Fe Indian Market
2006 Best of Division Award
2006 Heard Museum Guild Indian Fair & Market   
2004 Artists Choice Award
2003 Best of Division Award
2002 First Place in Class II, Division F at the SWAIA Indian Market in Santa Fe

Publications 

 Revolt: An Archaeological History of Pueblo Resistance and Revitalization in 17th Century New Mexico 
 WHITE SHELL WATER PLACE: An Anthology of Native American Reflections on the 400th Anniversary of the Founding of Santa Fe
 "Without Reservation" art ltd. magazine. Scott Andrews, March 2010
 Talking with the Clay: The Art of Pueblo Pottery in the 21st Century. Stephen Trimble. SAR Press, 2007
 Hopi and Pueblo Tiles: An Illustrated History. Kim Messier and Pat Messier. Rio Nuevo Publishers, 2007

References

External links 
 Jason Garcia (Okuu Pin) official site 

Living people
People from Grant County, New Mexico
Artists from New Mexico
University of New Mexico alumni
University of Wisconsin–Madison alumni
Year of birth missing (living people)